Gray O'Brien (born Gerard O'Brien, 11 August 1968) is a Scottish television and film actor, best known for his portrayal of the villainous Weatherfield businessman Tony Gordon in the popular ITV soap opera Coronation Street from 2007–2010, and as Richard McCaig on the BBC medical drama Casualty from 1996–1998.

Biography
O'Brien was born in Glasgow, the second youngest of seven children, and is a graduate of the Royal Scottish Academy of Music and Drama. Resident for a time in Cumbernauld, he has appeared in many television productions, including Taggart, Peak Practice, River City (as serial womaniser Billy Davis, and the 2007 Doctor Who Christmas special, "Voyage of the Damned". He played Prince Charles' valet in the 2006 motion picture The Queen.

O'Brien joined the cast of Coronation Street as the murderous factory boss Tony Gordon in September 2007. The actor explained in an interview that he uses sense-memory technique, drawing on "something dark from the past", to emote his powerful performances. Asked about female reaction to his character's on-screen conspiracy to murder love rival Liam Connor, played by pin-up Rob James-Collier, O'Brien joked: "I'm sure most viewers believe that it's just a story." O'Brien won Villain of the Year for the role at the 2009 British Soap Awards.

The Manchester show drew the ire of football fans when, in October 2008, several months after the 2008 UEFA Cup Final riots, in a scripted line, O'Brien's evil character made a jibe about Rangers F.C. Complaints led to a similar line being cut from the script of a later episode. Professing surprise at the outcry, the star said: "I'm a Celtic supporter but I need to be clear that I certainly wasn't going out of my way to antagonise any Rangers supporters."

In May 2009 Coronation Street producers announced that O'Brien's contract with the show had been extended to 2010. Gray left Coronation Street when his character was killed off at the end of a storyline, in which Tony Gordon held Hayley Cropper (Julie Hesmondhalgh) and Carla Connor (Alison King) hostage in the Underworld factory, which he sets ablaze; although his prisoners manage to escape alive.

He played Abanazar in the pantomime Aladdin at the Opera House, Manchester from 5 December 2009 to 3 January 2010. Between 4 December 2010 and 16 January 2011 he played the role again at the Theatre Royal, Nottingham.

O'Brien was judged Scotland's eleventh most eligible man in February 2009 by a Scotland on Sunday panel. He once said: "I actually find the heartthrob thing laughable," adding: "I am just a jobbing actor from Scotland and I don't think of myself as particularly good looking."

O'Brien has also appeared on Lily Savage's Blankety Blank.

In 2017, he appeared in ITV drama The Loch.

Personal life
O'Brien is divorced from his wife Lynn, whom he married on 9 May 1996. They have a son together called Conor (b. 2000), who made a cameo appearance in an episode of Coronation Street. O'Brien's late father, Eddie was also a fan of the long-running TV programme. O'Brien began dating make-up artist Jill Farimond in 2008, but it was reported in April 2009 that the couple had amicably split. His father died of a heart attack. In 2019 O'Brien was diagnosed with stage 4 tonsil cancer. He has since made a full recovery.

Filmography

Films

TV

References

External links
Fansite on Gray O'Brien
Message Board for Gray O'Brien
BBC article about Doctor Who casting

1968 births
Living people
Male actors from Glasgow
Scottish male soap opera actors
Scottish male television actors
Scottish people of Irish descent
Scottish Roman Catholics
British male soap opera actors
Alumni of the Royal Conservatoire of Scotland